The 1st Battalion, 160th Field Artillery Regiment is headquartered in Chandler, Oklahoma. It is a part of the 45th Infantry Brigade Combat Team, Oklahoma Army National Guard.

The 160th FA saw action during World War II and the Korean War as part of the 45th Infantry Division and again in Afghanistan and Iraq as part of the 45th Infantry Brigade.

Subordinate units 
Headquarters and Headquarters Battery, 1-160th Field Artillery at Chandler, OK
A Battery, 1-160th Field Artillery at Shawnee, OK
B Battery, 1-160th Field Artillery at Holdenville, OK
C Battery, 1-160th Field Artillery at Fort Sill, OK

Additionally, the 160th is supported by its Forward Support Company (FSC)

F Company, 700th Brigade Support Battalion at Chandler, OK

Deployments
WW II; (45th Infantry Division)

Korea; (45th Infantry Division)

Global War on Terror
Kuwait (45th Infantry Brigade)
Afghanistan, Consolidation I (45th Infantry Brigade)
Iraq Surge (45th Infantry Brigade)
Iraq Current (unnamed)

New Orleans (Hurricane Katrina/Rita) (45th Infantry Brigade)

History
LTC William S. Key, newly discharged from the US Army following World War I was appointed Captain of Field Artillery in the Oklahoma Army National Guard.  He was directed to organize a light artillery battery at Wewoka, Oklahoma. A 75mm battery was federally recognized as Battery A, 1st Oklahoma Field Artillery on July 28, 1920. Battery "A" became known as the "White Horse Battery" in recognition of the white horses used to tow the artillery pieces.  On 18 July 1921, the 1st Oklahoma Field Artillery Regiment, consisting of a Regimental Headquarters and two firing battalions, incorporating the White Horse Battery and other subsequently established artillery units, was federally recognized.

The 1st Oklahoma Field Artillery became the 160th Field Artillery Regiment in October 1921 with two battalions and would become one of the components of the 45th Infantry Division in 1923. The 160th Field Artillery Regiment was disbanded in 1940 when the division was "triangularized" and 1st Battalion became the 160th Field Artillery Battalion, while the 2nd Battalion was renamed the 171st Artillery Battalion. The 160th FA saw action in both World War II and Korea.  Thirty-six of its soldiers were killed during the Second World War.

During World War II the 160th FA normally operated in support of the 179th Infantry Regiment and would support the 279th Infantry during the Korean War.

Lineage & Honors

Lineage
 Constituted in 1920 in the Oklahoma National Guard as the 1st Regiment of Oklahoma Field Artillery. 
 Redesignated 10 October 1921 as the 160th Field Artillery and assigned to the 45th Division.
 Organized and Federally recognized 22 November 1921 with headquarters at Tulsa. 
 Inducted into Federal service 16 September 1940 at home stations. 
 Regiment broken up 11 February 1942 and its elements reorganized and redesignated as follows:
 Headquarters and Headquarters Battery disbanded; 
 2d Battalion as the 171st Field Artillery Battalion, an element of the 45th infantry Division (remainder of regiment—hereafter separate lineages). 
 171st Field artillery Battalion inactivated 24 November 1945 at Camp Bowie, Texas. Redesignated 12 June 1946 as the 160th Field Artillery Battalion, an element of the 45th Infantry Division.
 Consolidated 19 September 1946 with headquarters, 160th Field artillery (reconstituted 28 August 1945 in the Oklahoma National Guard), and consolidated unit reorganized and Federally recognized as the 160th Field Artillery Battalion with headquarters at Tulsa. 
 Ordered into active Federal service 1 September 1950 at home stations. 
(160th Field Artillery Battalion [NGUS] organized and Federally recognized 14 October 1952 with headquarters at Chandler.) 
 Released 30 April 1954 from active Federal service and reverted to state control; Federal recognition concurrently withdrawn from the 160th Field Artillery Battalion (NGUS).
 Reorganized and redesignated 1 May 1959 as the 160th Artillery, a parent regiment under the Combat Arms Regimental System, to consist of the 1st and 2d Howitzer Battalions, elements of the 45th Infantry Division. 
 Reorganized 1 April 1963 to consist of the 1st Battalion, an element of the 45th Infantry Division. 
 Reorganized 1 February 1968 to consist of the 1st Battalion, an element of the 45th Infantry Brigade. 
 Withdrawn 1 June 1989 from the Combat arms regimental System and reorganized under the United States Army Regimental System.

Campaign Participation Credit
 World War II: Sicily (with arrowhead); Naples-Foggia; Anzio; Rome-Arno; Southern France (with  arrowhead); Rhineland; Ardennes-Alsace; Central Europe
 Korean War: Second Korean Winter; Korea, Summer–Fall 1952; Third Korean Winter; Korea, Summer 1953

Global War on Terror
Operation Enduring Freedom
Afghanistan, Consolidation I
Operation Iraqi Freedom
Iraq Surge
Operation New Dawn
Iraq Current Campaign (unnamed)

Decorations
  Meritorious Unit Commendation (Army)
  Army Superior Unit Award
  French Croix de Guerre with Palm, World War II, Streamer embroidered ACQUAFONDATA (171st Field Artillery Battalion cited; DA GO 43, 1950)
  Republic of Korea Presidential Unit Citation, Streamer embroidered Korea 1951–1953 (160th Field Artillery Battalion cited; DA GO 30, 1954)
 Battery B (Seminole), 1st Battalion, additionally entitled to: 
  Meritorious Unit Commendation (Army), Streamer embroidered Korea 1953 (120th Engineer Combat Battalion cited; DA GO 22, 1954)

Distinctive unit insignia
Description
A gold color metal and enamel device 1 3/8 inches (3.49 cm) in height overall consisting of the shield, crest and motto of the coat of arms.

Symbolism
The shield is scarlet and yellow for Artillery. The dividing line represents the Red River; the projectile in chief, the Artillery fire; and the bezant in base, the clean cut hits made by the 160th Field Artillery Regiment.

Background
The distinctive unit insignia was originally approved for the 160th Field Artillery Regiment on 30 March 1927. It was redesignated for the 160th Field Artillery Battalion on 2 December 1942. It was redesignated for the 171st Field Artillery Battalion on 30 June 1955. The insignia was redesignated for the 160th Artillery Regiment on 18 October 1960. On 19 July 1972, the insignia was redesignated for the 160th Field Artillery Regiment.

References

Field artillery regiments of the United States Army National Guard
Military units and formations in Oklahoma
United States Army units and formations in the Korean War
Military units and formations established in 1921
Chandler, Oklahoma